Carrickfergus was a constituency represented in the Irish House of Commons from 1326 to 1800, the house of representatives of the Kingdom of Ireland.

Borough
This constituency was the county borough of Carrickfergus in County Antrim. It returned two members to the Parliament of Ireland to 1800.

History
In the Patriot Parliament of 1689 summoned by King James II, Carrickfergus was not represented. Following the Acts of Union 1800, the county borough retained one parliamentary seat in the United Kingdom House of Commons.

Members of Parliament, 1326–1801

Notes

References

Bibliography

Carrickfergus
Constituencies of the Parliament of Ireland (pre-1801)
Historic constituencies in County Antrim
1326 establishments in Ireland
1800 disestablishments in Ireland
Constituencies established in 1326
Constituencies disestablished in 1800